Tollywood films of the 1950s may refer to:
Bengali films of the 1950s
Telugu films of the 1950s